A Panamax port is a deepwater port that can accommodate a fully laden Panamax ship. With the completion of the Panama Canal expansion project in 2016, this list will need to be significantly revised due to larger "post panamax" ships transiting Panama.  Other lists are required for even bigger Valemax and Chinamax ships.

Africa

Mediterranean Sea 
 Djendjen (Jijel), Algeria
 Tanger-Med, Morocco

Atlantic Ocean 
(from North to South)
 Nouadhibou, Mauritania — iron ore terminal.
 Nouakchott, Mauritania — proposed railhead for phosphate mine.
 Sekondi-Takoradi, Ghana — built 1928
 Tema, Ghana — built 1961
 Cotonou — Benin
 Lomé — Togo
 Lekki Port, Nigeria under construction, largest deep water port in Africa with post-panamax capacity 
 Port Kamsar, Guinea — bauxite loading port, origin of Kamsarmax ship type.
 São Tomé e Príncipe - island transhipment port.
 Monrovia, Liberia — proposed deepening to 20m for 200,000t vessels.
 Ibom Deep Sea Port, Nigeria — undergoing implementation 
 Kribi, Cameroon — oil terminal
 Iron ore Mbalam and Nabela - 300 000 tonnes
 Bauxite - future 

 Owendo, Gabon — railhead
 Lobito, Angola
 Walvis Bay, Namibia — railhead
 Saldanha Bay, South Africa

Proposed 
(from North to South)
 Bargny, Senegal
 Matakong, Guinea — deepwater port for Simandou and Kalia iron ore
 Tagrin Point, Sierra Leone — for iron ore
 San Pédro, Côte d'Ivoire — for iron ore
 Port Notel Ocean Terminal, Ibeno Akwa-Ibom, Nigeria
 Ikot Akpatek, Akwa-Ibom, Nigeria — proposed
 Lolabé, Cameroon — iron ore export
 Malabo, Equatorial Guinea
 Santa Clara, Gabon — proposed deepwater port with railhead for Makokou iron ore.
 Indienne, Congo
 Barra do Dande, Angola (Bengo Province)
 Shearwater Bay, Namibia — coal (30 km south of Luderitz)

Red Sea 
 Berbera, Somalia
 Port Sudan, Sudan
 Massawa, Eritrea

Indian Ocean 
(from North to South)
 Mogadishu, Somalia
 Kismayo, Somalia
  Kilindini Harbour, Mombasa, Kenya
 Mtwara, Tanzania
 Nacala, Mozambique — railhead for Malawi
 Richards Bay, South Africa
 Ngqura, South Africa

Proposed 
 (from North to South)
  Lamu Port, Lamu, Kenya 
 Pangani, Tanzania
 Pemba, Mozambique
 Technobanine Point, Mozambique
 Vizjinjam Port, Kerala, India

Americas

Canada

Arctic Ocean 
 Port of Churchill — terminal on Hudson Bay that handles grain, bulk commodities, general cargo, and tanker vessels.

Atlantic Ocean 
 Sept-Îles — iron ore terminal on the Saint Lawrence River.
 Port Cartier — iron ore terminal on the Saint Lawrence River.
 Quebec City — deepwater terminal on the Saint Lawrence River and the gateway to the Great Lakes, capable of accommodating Panamax and Capesize vessels with 50 feet of water at low tide
 Chandler — large deepwater wharf
 Melford Terminal (proposed) — deepwater terminal on the Strait of Canso.
 Port of Saint John — deepwater port in the Bay of Fundy. 
 Port of Halifax — most easterly North American full-service container port.
 Sydney

Pacific Ocean 
 Port of Prince Rupert — deep sea port with direct rail connections to major North American cities.
 Port Alberni — fjord-like channel that deep sea vessels and cruise ships can easily navigate.
 Port of Vancouver — modern port of entry on the west coast of Canada.
 Squamish Terminals — breakbulk terminal on the west coast of Canada specializing in the movement of forestry, steel, and project cargo.
 Crofton — The main factor for its location is the depth of the water, unusual for the east coast of Vancouver Island.
 Kitimat — year-round deep-sea shipping connects North America to the Pacific Ocean and the Pacific Rim. According to the Transport Canada's Technical Review Process of Marine Terminal Systems and Transshipment Sites (TERMPOL) the passageway into the Port of Kitimat  is "safely accessible by Panamax vessels, VLCC (Very Large Crude Carrier) VLCC’s and Ultra Large Crude Carriers (ULCCs) up to 320,000 DWT. A strategic port in the proposed Enbridge Northern Gateway Pipelines project.

Greenland

Arctic Ocean 
 Thule Air Base, Greenland — northernmost deepwater port in the world.

United States

Atlantic Ocean 
 Port of Boston
 Port of New York and New Jersey, includes
 Port Newark-Elizabeth Marine Terminal
 Port Jersey
 Port of Philadelphia
 Port of Wilmington
 Port of Baltimore
 Hampton Roads — complex includes naval and commercial facilities
 Port of Virginia
 Naval Station Norfolk
 Port of Morehead City
 Port of Charleston
 Port of Savannah
 Port of Jacksonville
 Port Canaveral
 Port Everglades
 Port of Miami

Gulf of Mexico 
 Port Corpus Christi — fifth-largest port in the United States in total tonnage. Panamax class vessels are handled at the Port's Bulk Terminal.
 Port of Tampa
 Port of Mobile — only deepwater port in the state of Alabama
 Port of New Orleans
 Port of Beaumont — deepwater port located in Beaumont, Texas.
 Port of Galveston — oldest port on the Gulf Coast, west of New Orleans.
 Port of Houston — located in Houston, Texas, tenth-busiest port in world by tonnage.

Pacific Ocean 
 Port of Seattle
 Port of Tacoma
 Port Madison — sometimes called Port Madison Bay, a deepwater bay located on Puget Sound.
 Port Angeles
 Port of Grays Harbor
 Port of Longview
 Port of Kalama
 Port of Vancouver USA
 Port of Portland — three post-Panamax terminals.
 Port of Coos Bay — Oregon's second busiest seaport
 Port of Humboldt Bay — (aka Port of Eureka) the only deepwater port in California north of San Francisco Bay
 Port of Richmond
 Port of Stockton — California's farthest-inland deepwater port.
 Port of Oakland — channel is fifty feet deep and eight hundred feet wide.
 Port of Redwood City — resulting from dredging the mouth of Redwood Creek
 Port of Hueneme — only deepwater port between Los Angeles and San Francisco, and the only military deepwater port between San Diego Bay and Puget Sound
 Port of Los Angeles — busiest port in the United States.
 Port of Long Beach — one of the busiest container ports in the world.
 Port of San Diego — home to the bulk of the United States Navy Pacific Carrier Fleet. Only the first nine miles (14 km) of the bay are accessible to Panamax vessels.

Latin America and the Caribbean

Atlantic Ocean
 Buenos Aires — Argentina
 Bahía Blanca — Argentina
 Quequén —  Argentina
 Santos — Brazil
 Port of Tubarão, Vitória  — Brazil, largest iron ore embarking port in the world deep-water port receiving ships 350,000 tons
 Ponta da Madeira — Brazil
 Ponta Ubu — Brazil
 Guaiba — Brazil, iron ore export terminal owned and operated by Vale (ex CVRD) in Sepetiba Bay
 Itaguai, Rio de Janeiro — Brazil, iron ore export terminal now owned and operated by Vale (ex CVRD) in Sepetiba Bay
 Port of Montevideo — Uruguay
 Port of Paranaguá — Brazil, commodities
 Port of Rio Grande — Brazil, commodities

Caribbean Sea
 Barranquilla, Colombia
 Bridgetown — dredging project started in 2002 now allows for some of the world's largest cruise ships to berth in Barbados.
 Grand Bahama, Bahamas — Freeport Container Port
 Cartagena, Colombia
 Ciénaga, Colombia — coal export port
 Colón — Panama
 Boca Grande, Venezuela — iron ore transfer station
 Port Lafito — Port-au-Prince, Haiti

Pacific Ocean
 Buenaventura, Colombia
 Valparaíso — Chile
 Manta — Ecuador
 Puerto Bolívar — Ecuador
 Port of Ensenada, Baja California — Mexico
 Port of Lázaro Cárdenas — Mexico
 Manzanillo, Colima — Mexico

Proposed 
 Punta Colonet, Baja California — Mexico
 Posorja — Ecuador

Asia

Bangladesh

Proposed 
 Matarbari Port
 Payra, Patuakhali

Brunei
 Muara — Brunei's only deepwater port

Cambodia
 Port of Sihanoukville

China
 Anqing
 Beihai
 Caofeidian
 Dalian
 Dandong
 Dongguan
 Fangchenggang
 Foshan
 Fuzhou
 Guangzhou
 Haikou
 Huanghua
 Huizhou
 Huludao
 Humen
 Jiangyin
 Jiaxing
 Jingtang
 Jinzhou
 Lianyungang
 Lianyungang
 Longkou
 Luzhou
 Macun
 Maoming
 Meizhou
 Nanjing
 Nantong
 New Seaport
 Ningbo-Zhoushan
 Qingdao
 Qinhuangdao
 Qinzhou
 Quanzhou
 Rizhao
 Shanghai
 Shantou
 Shenzhen
 South Port
 Suzhou
 Taizhou
 Tianjin
 Weihai
 Wenzhou
 Wuhan
 Xiamen
 Xiuying
 Yangjiang
 Yangpu
 Yangshan
 Yangzhou
 Yantai
 Yantian
 Yingkou
 Yueyang
 Zhangzhou
 Zhanjiang
 Zhenjiang
 Zhongshan
 Zhuhai

Hong Kong 
 Kwai Chung / Tsing Yi
 Tuen Mun

India
 Dhamra Port
 Jawaharlal Nehru Port Trust, Navi Mumbai
 Krishnapatnam

Proposed 

 Port of Trivandrum, Trivandrum, Kerala
 Port of Dahej, Bharuch, Gujarat

Japan
 Port of Yokohama — post Panamax multi-purpose port
 Kashima — container, dry and wet bulk and general cargo port
 Fukuyama — multi-purpose and dry bulk port

Malaysia
 Port of Tanjung Pelepas
 Johor Port
 Melaka Gateway Deep Sea Port (planned)

Myanmar
 Thilawa Port
 Dawei Port

Proposed 
 Kyaukphyu — for import of oil to China

Pakistan
Port Qasim
Gwadar Port
Port of Karachi

Philippines
 Port of Manila
 Batangas International Port
 Port of Subic
 Mabini Bulk Grains Terminal

Taiwan
 Kaohsiung

Saudi Arabia
 Dammam
 Jeddah Seaport

Singapore
 Port of Singapore

Sri Lanka
 Colombo
 Hambantota

Thailand 

 Laem Chabang (1991)

United Arab Emirates
 Jebel Ali/Dubai

Vietnam 
 Cai Mep Thi Vai Port

Proposed 
 Van Phong Port

Europe

Nordic / Baltic 
 Reyðarfjörður, eastern Iceland
 Narvik, northern Norway
 Gothenburg, (west coast of Sweden) — largest port in Scandinavia
 Aarhus, (post-Panamax, main port of Denmark)
 Gdańsk, (Baltimax, post-Panamax, main port of Poland)
 Norrköping, (east coast of Sweden)
 Södertälje, Stockholm
 Helsinki, (post-Panamax, main port of Finland)
 Port of Kokkola, (Capesize, mainly bulk)
 Port of Pori
 Tallinn, Estonia
 Sillamäe, Estonia
 Klaipeda, Lithuania

North Sea / mainland 
 JadeWeserPort, Wilhelmshaven, Lower Saxony, Germany (oil, coal, chemicals.)
 Port of Amsterdam, North Holland, Netherlands
 IJmuiden, North Holland, Netherlands
 Rotterdam, South Holland (post-Panamax) — largest port in Europe
 Zeebrugge, West Flanders, Belgium
 Antwerp, Belgium
 Dunkirk, northern France (different kinds of liquid and bulk handling.)
 Le Havre, northern France (oil, coal, chemicals, container. Draft up to 82 feet)
 Zeeland Seaports, Zeeland,  ports of Vlissingen and Terneuzen

Iberia and Mediterranean 
 Algeciras, Andalusia, Spain
 Barcelona, Catalonia, Spain
 Cagliari, Sardinia, Italy
 Gijon, Asturias, Spain (draft up to 59 feet)
 Gioia Tauro, southern Italy
 Marseille-Fos Port, France
 Omišalj, Croatia (supertanker oil terminal)
 Port of Rijeka, Croatia
 Port of Genoa, Italy 
 Port of Lisbon, Portugal
 Sines, Portugal
 Port of Piraeus, Athens, Greece
 Port of Thessaloniki, Greece
 Port of Koper, Slovenia (post-Panamax) 
 Port of Trieste, Italy (draft up to 18m/59 feet)

Great Britain 
 Southampton, English Channel (post-Panamax, traditional liner port)
 Teesport, Middlesbrough, North Sea
 Falmouth, Cornwall, Atlantic Ocean
 Port of Tyne, Newcastle, North Sea
 Felixstowe, North Sea (post-Panamax, 35% of UK container traffic)
 Barrow, Irish Sea
 Liverpool, Irish Sea. New post-Panamax container terminal under construction, opening to coincide with the widening of the Panama Canal.
 Port Talbot, Bristol Channel
 Milford Haven, Irish Sea
 Invergordon, Moray Firth
 Hunterston Terminal, Firth of Clyde
 Hound Point, Firth of Forth
 London Gateway. Thurrock, Thames Estuary
 Portland Port, Portland Harbour, English Channel

Ireland 
 Cork, deep water multi modal port, south coast of Ireland. Celtic Sea/Atlantic Ocean.
 Aughinish, Ireland
 Moneypoint, Ireland

Oceania

Australia 
(clockwise from north)
 Port of Townsville — military port, mineral ores, fertilizer, concentrates, sugar and motor vehicles, able to accommodate 4 Panamax vessels at a time.
 Abbot Point — coal export terminal
 Dalrymple Bay — coal export terminal, part of Hay Point, Queensland
 Hay Point — BHP Mitsubishi Alliance coal export terminal
 Gladstone — coal
 Brisbane — coal, containers
 Newcastle — coal, wheat
 Port Botany (Sydney) — containers
 Port Kembla — coal, wheat, cars
 Melbourne
 Geelong
 Portland, Victoria
 Adelaide Outer Harbor — deepened to Post-Panamax in 2006
 Port Giles
 Port Bonython, Capesize — oil, LPG, diesel and proposed iron ore pending approval and construction of second jetty
 Whyalla, South Australia — 65,000t ships in inner harbor, Capesize iron ore bulkers serviced in Spencer Gulf via transshipment
 Port Lincoln — grain
 Fremantle
 Geraldton 
 Oakajee Port — under construction
 Dampier — north west Western Australia — iron ore.
 Cape Lambert upgrade 80 mtpa to 180 mtpa
 Port Hedland — north west Western Australia — iron ore.
 East Arm Wharf (Port of Darwin) — Panamax

New Zealand 
 Ports of Auckland, Auckland
 Lyttelton
 Marsden Point, Whangarei
 Port Taranaki, New Plymouth
 Port Chalmers, Dunedin
 Tauranga

(Source: Recount, Taranaki District Council newsletter, page 5.)

Other 

 Apra Harbor — deepwater port on the western side of Guam.

Maps 
 Africa
 South East Asia

See also 
 List of world's busiest transshipment ports
 Dry port
 Marine transfer operations
 Merchant vessel
 Petroleum transport

References 

Panamax